= Bhagamalini =

- Nitya associated with the waxing moon and tantric Srividya worship
- Devanagari: भगमालिनी
- Venerated in: Hinduism, Shaktism
- Affiliation: Nityas
- Color: Golden / Yellow
- Gender: Female

Bhagamalini is one of the sixteen Nitya goddesses (eternal lunar deities) venerated in the Srividya tradition of Shakta Tantrism.
